Thomas Hayes (born April 18, 1946) is a former professional American football cornerback who played six seasons in the National Football League, mainly for the Atlanta Falcons. He was born in Riverside, California, USA and attended San Diego State University.

1946 births
Living people
Players of American football from Riverside, California
American football cornerbacks
San Diego State Aztecs football players
Atlanta Falcons players
San Diego Chargers players